Elmar Altvater (Kamen, Province of Westphalia, 24 August 1938 – 1 May 2018) was Professor of Political Science at the Otto-Suhr-Institut of the Free University of Berlin, before retiring on 30 September 2004. He continued to work at the institute, and published articles and books.

As a student, Altvater studied economics and sociology in Munich, and attained a doctorate with a dissertation on "Environmental Problems in the Soviet Union". At the Otto-Suhr-Institut, he was active in socialist research groups, working with among others Klaus Busch, Wolfgang Schoeller and Frank Seelow, and he gained fame as one of Germany's most important Marxist philosophers, who strongly influenced the political and economic theory of the 1968 generation of radicals. His analysis, centered on the logic of capital accumulation crisis in state interventions is key to the Marxist theory of state-derivationism. Altvater argues that the state performs four general maintenance functions particular capitalists cannot undertake: providing an initial legal system with property and contract law, regulating the class struggle between workers and owners of capital, enforcing terms of international trade and market expansion through military presence, and providing infrastructure.

In 1970, he co-founded the German journal PROKLA - Journal for Critical Social Science of which he remained an editor. In 1971 he became university professor in political economy at the Otto-Suhr-Institut. Apart from questions of development theory, the debt crisis, and the regulation of markets, he remains preoccupied with the effects of capitalist economies on the environment.

Altvater was a noted critic of the political economy and author of numerous writings on globalization and critiques of capitalism. A standard work is his book The Limits of Globalization (1996), written with his companion Birgit Mahnkopf.

Altvater supported the German Greens for some time, but after the 1999 military intervention in Kosovo (which as a member of the governing coalition the party had to support) increasingly maintained a critical distance. He was a member of the Bundestag Commission of Inquiry The World Economy - Challenges and Answers (1999–2002). Altvater was a supporter of ATTAC (he was a member of its Scientific Advisory Board) and the World Social Forum.

Altvater has coined the term "Capitalocene", which is used by environmentalists as an alternative to the Anthropocene.

Primary literature 
 1969: 
 1969: 
 1979:  (with Jürgen Hoffmann and Willi Semmler)
 1983:  (with Kurt Hübner and Michael Stanger) 
 1987: 
 1991: . (translated into English as The Future of the Market: An Essay on the Regulation of Money and Nature after the Collapse of 'Actually Existing Socialism''' (Verso). English  
 1991: The Poverty of Nations: A Guide to the Debt Crisis-From Argentina to Zaire, by Kurt Hubner (Author), Jochen Lorentzen (Author), Elmar Altvater (Author, Editor), Raul Rojas (Editor), (St. Martin's Press) 
 1992: . Münster
 1994: 
 1996: (with Birgit Mahnkopf) . 
 1999: "Restructuring the space of democracy: the effects of capitalist globalization and the ecological crisis on the form and substance of democracy" in Global Ethics and Environment'', Editor Nicholas Low  
 2002: (with Birgit Mahnkopf): . 
 2005: . Münster: Westfälisches Dampfboot. 
 2007 Elmar Altvater & Birgit Mahnkopf, . 
 2008 Elmar Altvater & Achim Brunnengräber (eds.), . 
 2010 Elmar Altvater, .

References

External links 
 Website dedicated to Elmar Altvater
 Altvater old homepage at the Free University Berlin 
 New homepage at the FU 
 Elmar Altvater (1972). "Notes on Some Problems of State Interventionism"
 Overview of his life and work (in German)
 Birgit Mahnkopf: In memory of the life and work of Elmar Altvater

1938 births
2018 deaths
People from Kamen
People from the Province of Westphalia
Alliance 90/The Greens politicians
Labour and Social Justice – The Electoral Alternative politicians
The Left (Germany) politicians
21st-century German politicians
Sozialistischer Deutscher Studentenbund members
Academic staff of the Free University of Berlin
Marxist theorists
German Marxists
Members of the European Academy of Sciences and Arts